Guinea-Bissau sent a delegation of 32 people, 3 of them athletes who competed, to the 2008 Summer Olympics in Beijing, China.

Athletics

 Key
 Note – Ranks given for track events are within the athlete's heat only
 Q = Qualified for the next round
 q = Qualified for the next round as a fastest loser or, in field events, by position without achieving the qualifying target
 NR = National record
 N/A = Round not applicable for the event
 Bye = Athlete not required to compete in round

Men

Women

Wrestling

 Key
  – Victory by Fall.
  - Decision by Points - the loser with technical points.
  - Decision by Points - the loser without technical points.

Men's freestyle

References

Nations at the 2008 Summer Olympics
2008
Olympics